Emmanuel Bushayija (born 20 December 1960) is the claimant to the historical Kingdom of Rwanda, which was abolished in 1961. He was proclaimed the ceremonial successor to the royal title (Mwami) on 9 January 2017 under the reign name Yuhi VI. He succeeded his late uncle King Kigeli V and is a grandson of King Yuhi V.

Biography 
He grew up in exile in Uganda, where he studied at Iganga Secondary School and worked for Pepsi Cola in Kampala.

He also lived in Kenya, working in the tourism industry, before returning to Rwanda in July 1994 before moving to the United Kingdom six years later.

The accession of Yuhi VI was made by proclamation of the Royal Council of Abiru, who are a group of elders and privy to the king's wishes as advisors. According to custom, the Council of Abiru announces the king’s selection of successor from among his family members. Bushayija, his nephew, was named as his successor. The announcement was made by Boniface Benzinge, chairman of the Abiru council.

He is a naturalised  British citizen and  lives currently in Sale, near Manchester in northwest England. His wife, Lilian, is a local mental health support worker.

Honours

Rwandan Dynastic 
  Grand Master of the Royal Order of the Drum.
  Grand Master of the Royal Order of the Crown.
  Grand Master of the Royal Order of the Crested Crane.
  Grand Master of the Royal Order of the Lion (Intare).

Other Dynastic 
  Grand Cordon of the Royal Order of the Crown of Hawai'i (Royal House of Hawaii)
  Grand Cordon of the Royal and Hashemite Order of the Pearl (Royal House of Sulu)

External links
 Website of the Royal House of Rwanda

Ancestry

References

1960 births
Living people
Naturalised citizens of the United Kingdom
Pretenders
Pretenders to the Rwandan throne
Rwandan expatriates in Uganda
Rwandan monarchy
Rwandan emigrants to the United Kingdom